Johnny Ingebrigtsen (born 18 September 1959) is a Norwegian politician for the Socialist Left Party.

He served as a deputy representative to the Parliament of Norway from Finnmark during the terms 2005–2009 and 2013–2017. He hails from Nordkapp and has been a member of the county council. He has also chaired Finnmark Socialist Left Party.

In 2016 he came out in support of Brexit.

References

1959 births
Living people
People from Nordkapp
Deputy members of the Storting
Socialist Left Party (Norway) politicians
Finnmark politicians